Titulaer is a surname. Notable people with the surname include:

Boris Titulaer (born 1980), Dutch singer-songwriter
Chriet Titulaer (1943–2017), Dutch astronomer, media personality, and writer
12133 Titulaer, a main-belt asteroid named after Chriet Titulaer